The discography of Japanese singer-songwriter Kazumasa Oda consists of ten studio albums, four compilation albums, two cover albums, three video albums, and thirty solo singles. Oda began his career as a performer of the folk-rock band Off Course. He began releasing solo material in 1985. His 1991 single "Oh! Yeah!" / "Love Story wa Totsuzen ni" topped the Oricon Singles Chart and was certified two-times million by the Recording Industry Association of Japan (RIAJ). When his 2016 compilation album Ano Hi Ano Toki topped the Oricon Albums Chart, Oda became the oldest artist in the country to achieve the accomplishment.

Studio albums

Compilation albums

Cover albums

Singles

As lead artist

As a featured artist

Other charted songs

Videography

Video albums

Notes

References

Discographies of Japanese artists
Pop music discographies